Pierre-Marie Bossan (23 July 1814, in Lyon – 23 July 1888, in La Ciotat) was a French historicist architect, a pupil of Henri Labrouste, specialising in ecclesiastical architecture.

Life and work
In 1844 he was appointed architect to the diocese of Lyon, where his major work was the neo-Byzantine basilica of Notre-Dame de Fourvière (1872–84), on a height dominating Lyon. He also designed Lyon's Église Saint-Georges, an extension to the parish church at Ars-sur-Formans (1862–65) and churches at Régny, Neulise and Couzon-au-Mont-d'Or (1854–56), as well as the pilgrimage basilica of La Louvesc (1865) in the department of Ardèche, Dauphiné.

There are funerary monuments designed by Bossan at Valence.

He is buried in the Cimetière de Loyasse, Lyon.

Selected works
 1854–56: Cloister of the Visitandines, Lyon
 About 1855: Maison Blanchon, quai Fulchiron, Lyon. A house in Moorish taste
 1858–62: Église de l'Immaculée-Conception, Lyon
 completed 1859: Petit séminaire de Meximieux (Ain), today the Hôtel de Ville
 1862–65 Basilica at Ars-sur-Formans, département de l'Ain
 completed 1865: Église Sainte-Anne, Lyon. Unifinished; closed in 1938 and demolished 1939
 completed 1865: Église Saint-Maurice, Echallon
 1867: Construction begun on the parish church of Régnié-Durette, département of the Rhône; the structure was completed in 1895, after his death
 1872: Construction begun on Notre-Dame de Fourvière, Lyon. Inaugurated in 1896

See also
Parc des Hauteurs

Notes and references

External links

 L'œuvre de Pierre Bossan, 1891 by Thiollier, Félix

1814 births
1888 deaths
Architects from Lyon
19th-century French architects
Historicist architects
French ecclesiastical architects